Mzikayifane Elias Khumalo (born 1 January 1972) is a South African African National Congress politician who has been the Gauteng MEC for Cooperative Governance and Traditional Affairs, eGovernment and Research and Development since 2022 and a member of the Gauteng Provincial Legislature since 2019. He served as the chief whip of majority party in the provincial legislature from May 2019 until October 2022. Previously, he served as the Executive Mayor of the Randfontein Local Municipality from 2015 to 2016 and as the Executive Mayor of the Rand West City Local Municipality from 2016 to 2019.

Political career
A member of the African National Congress, Khumalo served as the Speaker of the Randfontein Local Municipality before he was elected as the Executive Mayor in March 2015, replacing Sylvia Thebenare, who had resigned. Prior to the August 3, 2016 local government elections, Khumalo was chosen to be the ANC's mayoral candidate for the Rand West City Local Municipality, which was established after the election. The ANC won a majority of seats on the council and Khumalo was elected as the inaugural Executive Mayor.

In 2018, he was a candidate for chairperson of the ANC's West Rand Region. He lost to Merafong mayor Maphefo Letsie.

Provincial legislature
In 2019 he stood for the Gauteng Provincial Legislature as 24th on the ANC's list of candidates. At the election, he won a seat in the legislature. Khumalo resigned as mayor on 22 May 2019, the same day he was sworn in as an MPL. Shortly afterwards, he was appointed as the chief whip of the ANC caucus, becoming the Chief Whip of the Majority Party.

On 7 October 2022, Khumalo joined the provincial government as the Member of the Executive Council (MEC) for the Department of Cooperative Governance and Traditional Affairs, eGovernment and Research and Development.

References

External links

Living people
1972 births
Zulu people
African National Congress politicians
Members of the Gauteng Provincial Legislature
21st-century South African politicians
Mayors of places in South Africa